In mathematics, the Freudenthal spectral theorem is a result in Riesz space theory proved by Hans Freudenthal in 1936. It roughly states that any  element dominated by a positive element in a Riesz space with the principal projection property can in a sense be approximated uniformly by simple functions. 

Numerous well-known results may be derived from the Freudenthal spectral theorem. The well-known Radon–Nikodym theorem, the validity of the Poisson formula and the spectral theorem from the theory of normal operators can all be shown to follow as special cases of the Freudenthal spectral theorem.

Statement 
Let e be any positive element in a Riesz space E. A positive element of p in E is called a component of e if .

Relation to the Radon–Nikodym theorem 
It can be shown that  is a Dedekind complete Banach Lattice with the total variation norm, and hence has the principal projection property.

See also 

 Radon–Nikodym theorem

References
 
 

Theorems in functional analysis